Arroz gordo (literally Fat rice) is a rice dish that is often consumed by Eurasian communities in Goa, Macao, Malaysia, and Singapore. It has been likened to a variant of Paella.

Etymology
The gordo in Arroz gordo denotes the richness and expanse of the ingredients.

History
Arroz gordo is often eaten during festive and/or special occasions, such as Christmas.

Ingredients
While different recipes call for different ingredients, Arroz gordo contains rice, chorizo (or sausage), Chicken, Pork and hard-boiled eggs.

The dish can take two days or more to make.

Curiosities
The Chicago restaurant Fat Rice takes its name from the dish.

References

Macanese cuisine
Christmas food